Japanese School of Manaus (Portuguese: Escola Japonesa de Manaus; Japanese: マナオス日本人学校 Manaosu Nihonjin Gakkō) is a Japanese international school in Manaus, Brazil. The school, which has students between the ages of 6 and 15, has 15 Brazilian Japanese students and 12 Japanese students as of 2013. It was established to educate children of Japanese businesspersons working in the Manaus area.

See also
 Brazilian schools in Japan
 List of Brazilian schools in Japan

References

Further reading

 "日本人学校の現状" (Archive). São Paulo Shimbun. 13 March 2008.
 Miura, Mitsutoshi (三浦 光俊). アマゾン川にいだかれて : マナオス日本人学校の三年間 ("Hugged by the Amazon River: 3 years of/at the Manaus Japanese school"). Kindai Bungeisha (近代文藝社/近代文芸社), 1994.11. . See profile at CiNii. See profile at National Diet Library. See entry at Amazon.co.jp.
 "マナウス日本人学校開校30周年＝日伯生徒共学の国際派＝アマゾン体験学習を実施＝川田さんの記念講演も" (Archive). Nikkey Shimbun. January 12, 2013.

External links
 Escola Japonesa de Manaus 
 Escola Japonesa de Manaus   (old site)

Schools in Manaus
Manaus
Secondary schools in Brazil
Education in Amazonas (Brazilian state)